{{DISPLAYTITLE:C14H18N2O3}}
The molecular formula C14H18N2O3 (molar mass: 262.30 g/mol, exact mass: 262.1317 u) may refer to:
 
 Methohexital, or methohexitone
 Reposal

Molecular formulas